The 2008 Asian Wrestling Championships were held in Jeju, South Korea. The event took place from March 18 to March 23, 2008.

Medal table

Team ranking

Medal summary

Men's freestyle

Men's Greco-Roman

Women's freestyle

Participating nations 
210 competitors from 18 nations competed.

 (21)
 (15)
 (19)
 (14)
 (21)
 (2)
 (21)
 (12)
 (13)
 (6)
 (2)
 (6)
 (20)
 (5)
 (5)
 (5)
 (17)
 (6)

References
Results

Asia
W
Asian Wrestling Championships
International wrestling competitions hosted by South Korea